The National System of Protected Natural Areas of Uruguay (commonly abbreviated as SNAP) is an instrument of policy implementation and national environmental action plans for Uruguay.

Its creation was established by Law 17,234 of February 22, 2000, which was regulated by Executive Decree No. 52/005 of February 16, 2005. This law aims to "harmonize the criteria for planning and managing protected areas under certain categories, with a single regulation that sets the guidelines system" (Art. 1).

Categories 

According to Law 17234, four categories of definition and management of the protected natural areas were established (Art.3°):
 National park: areas where there are one or more ecosystems that are not significantly altered by human exploitation and occupation, plant and animal species; they are geomorphological sites and habitats that have special scientific, educational and recreational interest, or include natural landscapes which are considered of exceptional beauty.
 Natural monument: areas containing one or more specific natural elements of remarkable national importance, such as a geological formation, a unique natural site, species, habitats or plants that may be endangered. Areas where human intervention, if realized, is small in impact and is under strict control.
 Protected landscape
 Protection sites

List of protected areas in Uruguay
Uruguay has 22 protected areas, covering 3.68% of the country's land area.

National designations

National parks
 Cabo Polonio National Park
 Esteros de Farrapos e Islas del Río Uruguay National Park
 Isla de Flores National Park
 San Miguel National Park

Natural monuments
 Grutas del Palacio Natural Monument

Protected landscapes
 Laguna de Castillos
 Laguna de Rocha
 Localidad Rupestre de Chamangá
 Paso Centurión y Sierra de Ríos
 Quebrada de los Cuervos y Sierras del Yerbal
 Valle de Lunarejo

Protected areas of managed resources
 Humedales del Santa Lucía
 Montes del Queguay

Habitat/species management areas
 Cerro Verde
 Esteros y Algarrobales del Río Uruguay
 Laguna Garzón
 Rincón de Franquía

International designations

UNESCO-MAB Biosphere Reserves
 Bañados del Este y Franja Costera
 Bioma Pampa Biosphere Reserve

Ramsar sites
 Bañados del Este
 Esteros de Farrapos e Islas del Río Uruguay National Park
 Laguna de Rocha

References 

 
Uruguay